Exberliner is an English-language magazine published in Berlin that was launched in 2002. It is published monthly (except for the July/August double issue) and available for €3.90 at newsstands around the city or by subscription. The magazine offers cultural listings, reviews, journalistic articles, opinion columns and a large classified section which is also continually updated online. It also regularly organizes parties and cultural events (such as the monthly English-language Wednesdays at Burger in Kaffee Burger) in English. The magazine was founded as a free newspaper in 2002 named The Berliner but was forced to change the name, which was already trademarked. The new name is intended as a play on expatriate (English-speaking expatriates being a major target audience). The publishing house Iomauna Media GmbH also operates Exberliner Flat Rentals, which helps foreigners rent apartments in Berlin, as well as Exberliner Jobs, a job board for internationals in Berlin.

In February 2013, Exberliner published an article which caused a lot of debate around the behaviour of expatriates in Berlin, and also led to discussions about gentrification in Berlin. The article lamented the fact that many expats in Berlin do not learn German.

References

External links
 Official Website
 Exberliner Flat Rentals
 Exberliner Jobs

2002 establishments in Germany
Cultural magazines
German-language magazines
Local interest magazines
Magazines established in 2002
Magazines published in Berlin
Monthly magazines published in Germany